The West Fork of the Little Sioux River is a river in the northwestern Iowa, United States.

The headwaters arise north of Marcus in Cherokee County and flows generally southwest through farmland in Plymouth and Woodbury counties until the meandered (old) streambed finally meets the Little Sioux River near Turin in Monona County.

However, the lower portion of the river, where the stream leaves the Loess Hills and enters the Missouri River floodplain near Holly Springs, Iowa, has been extensively channelized. Across this floodplain, most of the flow is actually carried by the Garretson and West Fork drainage ditches, which join to become the Monona-Harrison Ditch, which in turn enters the Missouri just upstream from the mouth of the Little Sioux in Harrison County.

See also
List of Iowa rivers

References

External links 
Geography of Woodbury County, including West Fork of the Little Sioux watershed

Rivers of Iowa
Rivers of Cherokee County, Iowa
Rivers of Plymouth County, Iowa
Rivers of Woodbury County, Iowa
Rivers of Monona County, Iowa
Rivers of Harrison County, Iowa
Tributaries of the Missouri River